The Kyūshū Q1W Tokai (東海 "Eastern Sea") was a land-based anti-submarine patrol bomber aircraft developed for the Imperial Japanese Navy in World War II. The Allied reporting name was Lorna. Although similar in appearance to the German Junkers Ju 88 medium bomber, the Q1W was a much smaller aircraft with significantly different design details.

Design and development

The Imperial Japanese Navy ordered development of the Kyūshū Q1W as the Navy Experimental 17-Shi Patrol Plane in September 1942, and the first test flight took place in September 1943. It entered service in January 1945. The Q1W carried two low-power engines, allowing for long periods of low-speed flight.

In same period Kyūshū built the K11W1 Shiragiku, a bomber training plane (also used in Kamikaze strikes) and the Q3W1 Nankai (South Sea), a specialized antisubmarine version of the K11W. The latter was of all-wood construction and was destroyed during a landing accident on its first flight.

Another specific anti-submarine airplane was the Mitsubishi Q2M1 "Taiyō" (which was derived from Mitsubishi Ki-67 Hiryū "Peggy" Torpedo-bomber), but this did not progress beyond the preliminary design stage.

Variants
 Q1W1 : one prototype.
 Q1W1 Tokai Model 11: main production model.
 Q1W2 Tokai Model 21: version with tail surfaces in wood, built in small numbers.
 Q1W1-K Tokai-Ren (Eastern Sea-Trainer): trainer with capacity for four, all-wood construction. One prototype built.

Specifications (Q1W1)

See also

Footnotes

Bibliography

External links

 AirToAirCombat.com: Kyushu Q1W Tokai

Q1W
Q1W, Kyushu
Low-wing aircraft
Aircraft first flown in 1943
Twin piston-engined tractor aircraft